It's OK, It's All Good is an album by the Mumbai-based band Pentagram.

It's OK, It's all Good was released in 2007. "Voice" was released as the first single and received considerable airplay on VH1. The song was used in a music video competition by VH1 and Nokia, and the video that was released features contributions from various fans across India who sent in their videos. The song, along with the music video, received considerable praise for its unique feel.

Tracks
Today
Electric
Rude
Animal
Rock 'N' Roll
Man Eat Man
Bad Man
This World Is Mine
The Jungle
Back To Zion
Don't Break My Beat
This Is For My People
Deep Down
Voice
This Is For My Moshpit
No Turning Back

External links
 
 Review of It's OK, It's All Good

2007 albums
Pentagram (Indian band) albums